William Sweeney (January 30, 1937 – March 21, 1991), was a Canadian professional ice hockey player, most notably for the Springfield Indians of the American Hockey League (AHL), for whom he played nine seasons and is the all-time career leading scorer for the franchise. Sweeney also played four games during the 1959–60 NHL season for the New York Rangers of the National Hockey League.

Sweeney led the Ontario Hockey League in scoring while playing for the Guelph Biltmore Mad Hatters in 1956–57, and followed that up by winning the 1958 AHL rookie of the year award playing for the Providence Reds. Sweeney later won three consecutive Calder Cup championships with the Springfield Indians, also leading the league in scoring three consecutive seasons, an unprecedented and unequalled feat in the AHL as of 2013.

Alcoholism came to dog Sweeney's career and by the time league expansion opened up the NHL in 1967 to promising minor-league scorers, Sweeney's skills were in decline. He remained in the minors, and his rights were sold by Springfield to the Vancouver Canucks of the Western Hockey League early in the 1968 season; he played only 26 more professional hockey games in his career. His final professional action was in the following season with the Rochester Americans of the AHL, in which he played ten games without a point. Sweeney's final organized hockey match was in 1970 with the Ontario senior league Oakville Oaks.

Awards
At the time of Sweeney's retirement, he was in the top ten in AHL history in goals (10th), assists (4th) and points (4th). He is, as of 2013, 11th in points, 22nd in goals and 9th in assists.

In the history of the Springfield Indians' franchise, Sweeney is third in goals behind Jim Anderson and Harry Pidhirny, second in points behind Anderson, and first in assists.

 1956–57 - Eddie Powers Memorial Trophy
 1957–58 - Dudley "Red" Garrett Memorial Award
 1960–61 - John B. Sollenberger Trophy
 1961–62 - John B. Sollenberger Trophy
 1962–63 - John B. Sollenberger Trophy

Sweeney was also named to the AHL's First All-Star Team in 1960 and 1962, and to the Second All-Star Team in 1961.

References

External links

1937 births
1991 deaths
Buffalo Bisons (AHL) players
Guelph Biltmore Mad Hatters players
Ice hockey people from Ontario
New York Rangers players
Providence Reds players
Rochester Americans players
Springfield Indians players
Springfield Kings players
Vancouver Canucks (WHL) players
Sportspeople from Guelph
Canadian ice hockey centres